Jeffrey Keith Bates (born 16 July 1950) is a former Australian rules footballer who played for Geelong in the Victorian Football League (now known as the Australian Football League).

References

External links
 
 

1950 births
Living people
Geelong Football Club players
Australian rules footballers from Victoria (Australia)